The Central Union of Machinists and Stokers and Kindred Trades of Germany (ZMH) was a trade union representing machine operators and those in related areas of work, in Germany.

The union was founded in Berlin in 1892, with the merger of various local unions, and affiliated to the General Commission of German Trade Unions.  It represented machinists, stokers, and those in related areas of work, regardless of the industry in which they were employed.  In 1919, the union was a founding constituent of the General German Trade Union Confederation, and by 1920, it had 100,287 members.  In 1927, the union established the International Federation of Enginemen and Firemen.

By 1928, the union's membership had declined to 48,568.  In 1933, the union was banned by the Nazi government.

Presidents
1906: Franz Scheffel
1918: Hermann Klebe

References

Engine operators' trade unions
Trade unions in Germany
Trade unions established in 1892
Trade unions disestablished in 1933